Dryophylax nattereri, the Amazon coastal house snake or northern coastal house snake,  is a species of snake in the family Colubridae. The species is found in 	Guyana, Suriname, French Guiana, Brazil, Peru, Venezuela, Colombia, Bolivia, and Ecuador.

References

Dryophylax
Snakes of South America
Reptiles of Venezuela
Reptiles of Brazil
Reptiles described in 1820